The Longest Yard may refer to:
 The Longest Yard (1974 film), starring Burt Reynolds
 The Longest Yard (2005 film), remake of the 1974 film starring Adam Sandler and Chris Rock
 The Longest Yard (soundtrack), soundtrack for the 2005 remake.
 The Tackle, the play that ended Super Bowl XXXIV one yard short of the goal line